Ilaria Pino (born 18 February 1983) is an Italian softball player who competed in the 2004 Summer Olympics.

References

1983 births
Living people
Italian softball players
Olympic softball players of Italy
Softball players at the 2004 Summer Olympics
Place of birth missing (living people)